Krasnobrodsky is an urban locality (an urban-type settlement) in Kemerovo Oblast, Russia. Population:

Administrative and municipal status
Within the framework of administrative divisions, it is, together with two rural localities, incorporated as Krasnobrodsky Urban-Type Settlement Under Oblast Jurisdiction—an administrative unit with the status equal to that of the districts. As a municipal division, Krasnobrodsky Urban-Type Settlement Under Oblast Jurisdiction is incorporated as Krasnobrodsky Urban Okrug.

References

Notes

Sources

Urban-type settlements in Kemerovo Oblast
